Michal Brož (born 16 June 1992) is a Czech athlete specialising in the 400 metres hurdles. He represented his country at four consecutive European Championships reaching the semifinals on each occasion.

His personal best in the event is 49.78 seconds set in Tampere in 2013.

International competitions

References

1992 births
Living people
Czech male hurdlers